The Kaneshi markets Limited is a trading centre in Kaneshie, Accra, Ghana. It was built in the 1970s. The name "Kaneshie" means "under the lamp" referring to its beginnings as a night market.

During the 2015 Accra floods, the market was submerged and operations were forced to shut down.

References

Accra
Retail markets in Ghana